The Tenggara hill myna (Gracula venerata) is a member of the starling family. It is a resident of Indonesia.

References

Gracula
Birds of Indonesia
Birds described in 1850
Taxa named by Charles Lucien Bonaparte